Otila may refer to:
 Jyrki Otila, a Finnish quiz show host
 913 Otila, an asteroid